The People's Republic of China competed at the 2012 Summer Olympics in London, the United Kingdom, between 27 July and 12 August 2012. This was the nation's ninth appearance at the Summer Olympics since its debut in 1952. A total of 396 Chinese athletes, 171 men and 225 women, were selected by the Chinese Olympic Committee to compete in 23 sports. For the fourth time in its Olympic history, China was represented by more female than male athletes.

China left London with a total of 91 medals – 39 gold, 31 silver, and 22 bronze – finishing second only to the United States in the global medal standings. The Chinese delegation proved particularly successful in several sports, winning twelve medals in gymnastics, ten in diving and swimming, eight in badminton, seven in weightlifting and shooting, and six in table tennis. Chinese athletes dominated in badminton and table tennis, where they each won gold medals in all sporting events. Eleven Chinese athletes managed to defend their titles from the 2008 Olympics, which China hosted; 18 of them won more than one Olympic medal in London. China also won its first ever Olympic medal in modern pentathlon.

Among the nation's medalists were Sun Yang and Ye Shiwen, who emerged as China's first swimmers to win two gold medals in their events; Sun and Ye broke a world record and an Olympic record, respectively. Sun also dominated the nation's Olympic medal standings, winning four medals. Gymnast Zou Kai, who won two golds and one bronze in London, became the most successful Chinese athlete in history with a total of six Olympic medals. Springboard diver Wu Minxia became the first Chinese athlete to win a gold medal in a single event at three consecutive Olympic Games. Meanwhile, Chen Ruolin became the second diver in Chinese history to defend two Olympic titles at a single games, after Guo Jingjing did so in two springboard events in 2008.

Medalists

| width="70%" align="left" valign="top" |

By chronological order

| width="30%" align="left" valign="top" |

Multiple medalists

Repeat medalists
Successful defending champions are marked in bold.

Medal distribution

| width="25%" align="left" valign="top" |

By sport

| width="25%" align="left" valign="top" |

By date

| width="25%" align="left" valign="top" |

By gender

| width="22%" align="left" valign="top" |

By dominance
Won all gold medals in one sport – 2
 Badminton – 5 golds
 Table tennis – 4 golds

Won all medals in one event (Podium Sweep) – 1
 Athletics – Women's 20 kilometres walk

Won gold and silver medals in one event – 7
 Badminton – Women's singles, also with fourth place
 Badminton – Mixed doubles
 Diving – Women's 3 metre springboard
 Gymnastics – Women's balance beam
 Table tennis – Men's singles
 Table tennis – Women's singles
 Weightlifting – Men's 77 kg

Won gold and bronze medals in one event – 5
 Athletics – Men's 20 kilometres walk, also with fourth place
 Badminton – Men's singles
 Gymnastics – Men's trampoline
 Shooting – Women's 10 metre air rifle
 Swimming – Women's 400 metre individual medley

Won gold medals in both men's and women's events – 6
 Badminton – Singles
 Badminton – Doubles
 Diving – Synchronized 3 metre springboard
 Diving – Synchronized 10 metre platform
 Table tennis – Team
 Table tennis – Singles

Competitors
The Chinese Olympic Committee selected a team of 396 athletes, 171 men and 225 women, to compete in 23 sports. Equestrian, football, and handball were the only sports in which China had no representation in 2012.

The Chinese team featured 29 defending champions from the Beijing games, including springboard diver Wu Minxia, light flyweight boxer Zou Shiming, gymnasts Zou Kai and Chen Yibing, and badminton player Lin Dan. Pistol shooter and former Olympic medalist Tan Zongliang, the oldest male member of the contingent, aged 41, competed at his fifth Olympic Games. Meanwhile, fencer Li Na and basketball player Wang Zhizhi each made their fourth Olympic appearance. Trap shooter Liu Yingzi was the oldest athlete of the team, aged 41, while relay swimmer Qiu Yuhan was the youngest, aged 14. Basketballer Yi Jianlian, who had previously played for the NBA's Dallas Mavericks, was the nation's flag bearer at the opening ceremony.

The following table lists the number of Chinese competitors who participated in each Olympic sport. Note that swimming, synchronized swimming, diving, and water polo are technically considered as one sport, aquatics. However, due to their significant practical differences, they are listed separately by tradition.

Archery

China qualified 3 archers for the men's individual event, 3 archers for the women's individual event, a team for the men's team event, and a team for the women's team event.

Men

Women

Athletics

Prior to the 2012 Olympics, Chinese athletes achieved qualifying standards in the following athletics events (up to a maximum of 3 athletes in each event at the 'A' Standard, and 1 at the 'B' Standard):

Men
Track & road events

Field events

Women
Track & road events

Field events

On 1 May 2013, the IOC stripped Russian discus thrower Darya Pishchalnikova of her silver medal in the women's discus throw after testing positive for Oxandrolone (an anabolic steroid). China's Li Yanfeng was elevated to silver.

Badminton

China won 12 quotas with 17 athletes for the 2012 Olympics.
Men

Women

Mixed

Basketball

China's male and female basketball teams both qualified for the 2012 Olympic Games.
 Men's team event – 1 team of 12 players
 Women's team event – 1 team of 12 players

Men's tournament

Roster

Group play

Women's tournament

Roster

Group play

Quarter-final

Boxing

China qualified boxers for the following events in 2012:

Men

Women

Canoeing

Slalom
China qualified boats for the following slalom events:

Sprint
China qualified boats for the following sprint events:

Men

Women

Qualification Legend: FA = Qualify to final (medal); FB = Qualify to final B (non-medal)

Cycling

China qualified the following cyclists for the 2012 Games:

Road

Track
Sprint

Team sprint

Pursuit

Keirin

Omnium

Mountain biking

Diving

The Chinese diving team qualified 12 divers across all diving events at the 2012 Olympics through the 2011 World Aquatics Championships.
Men

Women

Fencing

China qualified 13 fencers for nine events at the 2012 Olympics.

Men

Women

Field hockey

The Chinese women's hockey team qualified a team of 16 players for the 2012 Olympics, by virtue of winning the 2010 Asian Games hockey title.

Women's tournament

Roster

Group play

5th/6th place

Gymnastics 

A total of 15 Chinese gymnasts competed at the 2012 Olympics.

Artistic
Men's team

Men's individual finals

Women's team

Women's individual finals

Rhythmic

Trampoline

Judo

Eight Chinese athletes – one man and seven women – competed in the Olympic judo events.

Men

Women

Modern pentathlon

Based on their results at the 2011 Asian/Oceania Championships, four Chinese pentathletes qualified for the 2012 games. Cao Zhongrong and Wang Guan earned places in the men's event, while Chen Qian and Miao Yihua earned places in the women's event.

Rowing

Men

Women

Qualification Legend: FA=Final A (medal); FB=Final B (non-medal); FC=Final C (non-medal); FD=Final D (non-medal); FE=Final E (non-medal); FF=Final F (non-medal); SA/B=Semifinals A/B; SC/D=Semifinals C/D; SE/F=Semifinals E/F; QF=Quarterfinals; R=Repechage

Sailing

China qualified one boat for each of the following events:

Men

Women

M = Medal race;  EL = Eliminated – did not advance into the medal race

Shooting

The following 23 quota places were qualified for the Chinese shooting squad at the 2012 Games:

Men

Women

Swimming

Chinese swimmers achieved qualifying standards in the following Olympic events (up to a maximum of 2 swimmers in each event at the Olympic Qualifying Time (OQT), and one at the Olympic Selection Time (OST)):

Men

Women

Synchronized swimming

China qualified a duet and a team.  The team consisted of 9 athletes, 8 in action and 1 in reserve.

Table tennis

China qualified four athletes for the singles table tennis events at the 2012 Olympics. Wang Hao and Zhang Jike qualified for the men's event, while Li Xiaoxia and Ding Ning qualified for the women's event.

Men

Women

Taekwondo

China ensured berths in the following taekwondo events by reaching the top 3 of the 2011 WTF World Qualification Tournament:

Tennis

Triathlon

China qualified the following triathletes for the 2012 Olympics:

Volleyball

Beach

Indoor

China qualified a 12-person women's team for the indoor volleyball tournament.

Women's tournament
Team roster

Group play

Quarter-final

Water polo

China qualified a 13-member women's water polo team.

Women's tournament

Team roster

Group play

Quarterfinals

5th-8th Place

5th-6th Place

Weightlifting

China qualified 6 men and 4 women for the Olympic weightlifting competition.
Men

Women

Wrestling

China qualified 8 quota places for wrestling at the 2012 games.

Men's freestyle

Men's Greco-Roman

Women's freestyle

See also
China at the 2012 Summer Paralympics
Olympic competitors for China
Sports in China

References

External links
China – London2012.com  (schedules, athletes, medals, profiles and photos)
Official homepage of the Chinese Olympic Committee  and English version
Official CCTV-5 Olympics coverage  and English version

Nations at the 2012 Summer Olympics
2012
Summer Olympics